Yago Santos may refer to:

 Yago dos Santos (born 1999), Brazilian basketball player
 Yago Santos (footballer) (born 2003), Brazilian football midfielder

See also
 Yago (footballer, born 1995), born Yago Henrique Severino dos Santos, Brazilian football defensive midfielder